The South African Geographical Journal is the official journal of the Society of South African Geographers. The journal was established in 1917.

The South African Geographical Journal was founded in 1917 and is the flagship journal of the Society of South African Geographers. The journal aims at using southern Africa as a region from, and through, which to communicate geographic knowledge and to engage with issues and themes relevant to the discipline. The journal is a forum for papers of a high academic quality and welcomes papers dealing with philosophical and methodological issues and topics of an international scope that are significant for the region and the African continent, including:

Climate change
Environmental studies
Development
Governance and policy
Physical and urban Geography
Human Geography
Sustainability
Tourism
GIS and remote sensing
The journal welcomes manuscripts in the following formats:

Research papers
Review articles on current debates and issues
Book reviews
Peer Review Statement
All submitted manuscripts are subject to initial appraisal by the Editors, and if found suitable for further consideration, to peer review by independent, anonymous expert referees and peer review is double blind.

Geography journals
Publications established in 1917
English-language journals
Biannual journals
Taylor & Francis academic journals
Academic journals published in South Africa